Mohammed Omer, (born 1984) is a Palestinian journalist.  He has reported for numerous media outlets, including  The New York Times, the Washington Report on Middle East Affairs, Al Jazeera, New Statesman, Pacifica Radio, Electronic Intifada, The Nation, Inter Press Service, Free Speech Radio News, Vermont Guardian, ArtVoice Weekly, the Norwegian Morgenbladet, and Dagsavisen, the Swedish dailies Dagen Nyheter and Aftonbladet the Swedish magazine Arbetaren, the Basque daily Berria, the German daily Junge Welt and the Finish magazine Ny Tid. He also founded Rafah Today and is the author of several books, including Shell-Shocked

Awards
In 2008, Omer was awarded the 2007 Martha Gellhorn Prize for Journalism. In the award citation, he was honored as "the voice of the voiceless" and his reports were described as an "humane record of the injustice imposed on a community forgotten by much of the world". Noam Chomsky said he had been following Omer's work for several years and was pleased to learn of his award, "an honor that he richly deserves".  He went on, he "...has continued his work with courage and integrity. It is no exaggeration to say that he can serve as a model of honorable journalism." He was awarded the Ossietzky Prize by the Norwegian branch of P.E.N. International in 2009, for "outstanding achievements within the field of free expression". He was also given an honorable mention in Pulse Media's 20 Top Global Media Figures of 2009.

 "Best Youth Voice" (2006).
 Martha Gellhorn Prize for Journalism (2008) 
 Ossietzky Prize (2009)
 Press Freedom Prize (2009)
 Ranked 398 by Arabian Business Power 500 (2013)

Background
Omer was raised in the Rafah refugee camp at the southern end of the Gaza Strip near the Egyptian border. He began working to support his family at the age of six when his father was in an Israeli prison. In time, he took a job at a backpack factory and since then has been a translator, journalist and program co-ordinator.

Omer graduated with dual bachelor degrees, English and literature, from the Islamic University of Gaza in June 2006.

Incidents
Israeli restrictions have sometimes stopped him travelling to the West Bank.

In 2008, while traveling back to the Gaza Strip via Allenby Bridge to the West Bank, Omer reported that he was stripped to his underwear, humiliated and beaten by Israeli soldiers while traveling into the West Bank from Jordan. According to a United Nations report, Omer is convinced that the brutal assault occurred when the security services were frustrated at their inability to confiscate the money he had been awarded.

He was subsequently hospitalized on his return to Gaza, where it was discovered that he had sustained several broken ribs and various bodily contusions as a result of the ordeal. Omer has recovered since and has been able to maintain his position as a journalist. The government of The Netherlands, which had sent a diplomat to welcome Omer and accompany him to Gaza, lodged an official protest with Israel about his mistreatment.

References

External links
Mohammed Omer 2007 Martha Gellhorn Prize
Gaza journalist Mohammed Omer: His life and words
Rafah Today
Telephone Interview with Mohammed Omer Regarding Detainment Abuse on Democracy Now
Mohammed Omer's 'Truth'
The Dangers and Difficulties of Reporting from Gaza
 Life in Hell: A Journalist's Account of Life in Gaza" with Mr. Mohammed Omer at The Palestine Center

1984 births
Living people
People from the Gaza Strip
Palestinian reporters and correspondents
Alternative journalists
Islamic University of Gaza alumni